Hypsoropha hormos, the small necklace moth, is a moth of the family Erebidae. The species was first described by Jacob Hübner in 1818 and it is found in the southeastern United States.

Description
Adult wings are brown with a postmedial band of white spots meeting at the inner margins, like a white necklace. The species is similar in appearance to the larger large necklace moth (Hypsoropha monilis), and the ranges of the two species broadly overlap.

Range
The species' occurrence range extends from Texas and Kansas in the west to Florida and New Jersey in the east.

Life cycle

Adults
Adults have been reported from February to October, with most sightings from April to August.

References 

Moths described in 1818
Hypocalinae